Calyce reginae is a species of beetle in the Calyce genus. It was discovered in 1942.

References

Mordellidae
Beetles described in 1942